The Structure of Literature is a book of literary criticism written by Paul Goodman and published by the University of Chicago Press in 1954.

Background 

The Structure of Literature is a work of literary criticism, a professionalized version of a genre known as belles lettres, for writing that focuses on aesthetics and is associated with humanistic intellectual discussions (dialectics). The author Paul Goodman developed from this tradition. In the early 1930s, Goodman informally audited classes taught by the neo-Aristotelian Richard McKeon at Columbia University. When McKeon became a dean at the University of Chicago, Goodman accompanied him and became a humanities graduate student. In early 1934, Goodman published an article on aesthetics in the Journal of Philosophy, whose main points, according to literary critic Kingsley Widmer, would become the central points of Goodman's dissertation, published 20 years later in 1954.

In formal literary analysis, as put by Goodman, a work derives meaning from how its parts interrelate to form a whole.

Contents 

In a combination of Gestalt psychology and Chicago School Neo-Aristotelianism, Goodman seeks to construct and demonstrate a method of literary analysis in The Structure of Literature. This method, which he calls "inductive formal analysis", entails finding the work's formal structure in the critic's experience of the work, as opposed to the text or external factors alone, and using those structural parts in combination to explain the whole. The book applies this method to a series of individual literary works as examples, using a combination of close analysis and genre discussion. He restricts his technical approach to how the parts within the work's structure interact, and avoids making value judgments of the works themselves, apart from that "bad" literature does not integrate its parts. Parts within a literary work may include elements such as hidden plot, character involvement, and dramatic reversals. Goodman's analysis considers each work's structure independently.

The first chapter differentiates "inductive formal analysis" from other methods of formal criticism. He names two other types: "Genre criticism", which focuses on classification, definition, and comparative norms, and "practical criticism", which focuses on translating a work's meaning without external comparisons. Goodman's "inductive formal analysis" is meant to balance shortcomings of those methods, with the critic studying the formal parts of a work and deriving definitions that can be used across works. Goodman's book argues for the third, with examples of its application, without slighting the former two. His emphasis is on narrative plot, the elements that continue or change between the work's beginning and end. The book's examples are broken into genres that he attributes to Aristotle: "serious plots, comic plots, novelistic plots, considerations of diction, and special problems of unity".

The next three chapters evaluate serious, comic, and novelistic plots. In "serious plots", the characters are intertwined with and indistinguishable from the plot. Goodman builds from concepts in Aristotle's Poetics (Aristotle), using Aristotle's analysis of two Sophocles plays, Oedipus Rex and Philoctetes, to distinguish Aristotle's method from Goodman's own. Aristotle's definition of tragedy, Goodman contends, is as if derived from Oedipus Rex. The Aristotelian formal model based on Oedipus Rex, continues Goodman, does not work for Philoctetes, as the play's miraculous divine intervention is a function of its plot, and not  simply theatrical artifice. Goodman also analyzes Shakespeare's play Richard II and Virgil's epic poem, the Aeneid. In "comic plots", the character is further removed from the plot so the reader is less affected by the character's destruction. His examples are from the 17th century, including Ben Jonson's play The Alchemist, Shakespeare's play Henry IV, Part 1, and John Dryden's verse satire Mac Flecknoe, which Goodman rates as pure comic, pure serious and pure comic separated, and serious and comic mixed. In "novelistic plots", the characters respond to rather than identify with the plot, with examples including Gustav Flaubert's 1869 novel Sentimental Education, Franz Kafka's 1926 novel The Castle, and Shakespeare's Hamlet.

In the fifth chapter, Goodman addresses lyrical poems, which he breaks into elements such as feeling, reflection/thinking, image, and stylistic attitude. (While these elements appear in long-form works, they are subordinate to larger structural elements of character, plot, and thesis in those works.) Goodman's performs a close analysis of Milton's 17th-century "On His Blindness" and Tennyson's 19th-century "Morte d'Arthur", with formal analysis of "texture" including elements like word sound, weight, syntax, tone, and metaphor. He introduces six potential ways to relate sonnet stanzas and inferential thought. Goodman also analyzes the verse Catullus 46.

The sixth chapter addresses four "special problems of unity" to apply extrinsic elements to the inductive formal analysis. In Hawthorne's 1836 short story "The Minister's Black Veil", Goodman connects the story's characterization with its climax and resolution. In the examples of a translation of Baudelaire's sonnet "La Géante" and a film adaptation of Labiche's 1851 play Un Chapeau de Paille d'Italie, Goodman notes how formal elements change within transformations of works, such that character, rhythm, syntax, theme, and other elements change from the original. In the example of "La Géante", Goodman concludes that the sonnet and its translation differ in genre. He also cites Longfellow's "The Builders" in demonstration of a good poet's ability to write bad poems.

Goodman ends with an analysis of Pierre Corneille's 17th-century tragedy Horace that uses his inductive formal method alongside other critical modes to highlight its psychology of war. He criticizes Corneille's decision to not portray the real atrocities of war.

Publication 

Paul Goodman finished his doctoral dissertation at the University of Chicago by 1940 yet received no formal degree for over a decade, being unwilling to pay to have it typeset. The dissertation, The Formal Analysis of Poems, compiled studies Goodman had created for courses on criticism and the analysis of ideas. It took until 1954 for him to receive his degree, when the university accepted a copy of the newly titled The Structure of Literature in lieu of the dissertation's typescript. Goodman's mentor Richard McKeon and Benjamin Nelson, both Chicago professors, convinced the University of Chicago Press to publish the work. Goodman revised the published edition to include new academic material including a section from Kafka's Prayer (1947), Goodman's analysis of the works of novelist Franz Kafka, and a glossary.

The University of Chicago Press published a cloth hardback edition on April 30, 1954. A paperback edition from the Press's Phoenix Books imprint followed in 1962, as did a Spanish translation from Siglo XXI in 1971. The book is dedicated to Goodman's teachers: Richard McKeon, Rudolf Carnap, and Morris Cohen.

Reception 

Reviews listed in Book Review Digest were of mixed favor. 

Henry David Aiken said the book was not bad, but imperfect. Nicholas Moore wrote that it was scholarly, epigrammatic, entertaining, "valuable essay in poetics ... with never a dull moment", with a certain brilliance that would annoy more solemn literary critics. 

Critics described the method as falling short of its aims. Based on the Goodman's applied examples applied, philosopher Henry David Aiken did not believe that "inductive formal analysis" constituted a new type of analysis. Literary critic Harry Levin agreed that the method had no "special light to cast" and poet Nicholas Moore said, despite describing the book as a "tour de force", that Goodman had not entirely fulfilled his argument. Goodman engaged some reviewers with psychological insight and "incisive asides", but as one critic put it, they were the insights of a poet and outsider rather than a theorist.  As Books Abroad wrote, these flashes of brilliance became lost in Goodman's attempts to create an Aristotelian analytic method. 

In The Structure of Literature, Goodman repeatedly concedes that he is abstracting structures within the work rather than probing for the meaning of the text itself. His analysis was thus reduced to techncial interactions and unbased generalities. As literary critic Kingsley Widmer reasoned, Goodman neglected his best perceptions as digressions rather than as the star of his analysis. Widmer saw Goodman's method as objectifying "wrong judgments about "form" and "structure" into uncorrectable "abstracted schematisms". Goodman's method, said Levin, redefines concepts like "God" or "sin" by their structural use within a work, like a kind of "literary behaviorism" that produces categories ultimately more conceptual than artistic or formal. Goodman, continued Levin, appears more interested in his schematism than his subject's technique. Widmer did not consider Goodman's approach novel but rather an "earnest genre applications of the stock neo-Aristotelian abstractions". Critic Elmer Borklund recommended the Aristotelian method of R. S. Crane and Elder Olson instead.

Reviewers remarked on glaring style issues in Goodman's own text: with "a certain aridity and addiction to jargon", and "dizzying and not always grammatical shifts from the gnomic to the off-hand", lacking both in grace and basic clarity. One critic found some passages impenetrable due to style issues, requiring the reader to mentally rewrite sentences to understand Goodman's intention and making the reader doubt otherwise straightforward sentences. More bluntly, his style obscured his argument. As Books Abroad put it, the "application of his theory is rather hopelessly lost in a critical apparatus so elaborate that it requires a glossary". Goodman's case for formalism, wrote Poetry, required better rhetoric. The Kenyon Review said that Goodman's "odd ... pretentiousness" detracted from his argument and made his own writing look bad by his own standard. Reviewers described a text rife with neologisms and jargon, in which special terms mask otherwise facile or redundant points simple words become technical jargon, and the author's tone frequently swaps between "high-falutin' critical terminology" and "quite excessively American colloquialisms". 

Among Goodman's analyses of individual texts, some stood out to reviewers. Two praised his analyses of the translation of Baudelaire's "La Géante", particularly when he focused less on structure and wrote with greater clarity. In split opinion, The Times Literary Supplement complimented Goodman's Catullus analysis, while Levin said his reading had no textual basis and Widmer considered Goodman's metrical analysis to be hackneyed and beyond the scope of his method. Some of Goodman's plot definitions did not hold either, as being either unfitting, imprecise, circularly defined, or lacking consistency or rigor in their application. For instance, while Goodman defines Oedipus and Philoctetes as serious plots, the two are so disparate in final effects that the categorization loses its definitional value.

Legacy 

Poet Jackson Mac Low wrote that Goodman was a crucial contributor to the development of Aristotelian formal criticism at the University of Chicago at the turn of the 1940s, what became known as the "Chicago School" and affiliated with Richard McKeon and R. S. Crane. On reflection, Goodman said that he had been brought to Chicago to work on aesthetics and his dissertation had been his course in practical criticism, the invention of Aristoltelian poetics synonymous with the Chicago School. Though Goodman had hoped for academic recognition from finally publishing his dissertation, it did not come, nor was his method accepted by the field. In overall summary of Goodman's several works of literary criticism, literary critic Kingsley Widmer wrote that each book have a different focus, whether psychoanalysis, polemic, or apologia, each with a sense of "unseriousness". Goodman later wrote four "Cubist plays" in which he meant to illustrate the ideas of his dissertation by making characters into archetypes and abstracting its use of plot.

References

Bibliography

External links 

 

1954 non-fiction books
American non-fiction books
Books by Paul Goodman
Books of literary criticism
English-language books
University of Chicago Press books